PDQ may refer to:
 PDQ Food Stores, US
 PDQ Chocolate, a drink mix
 PDQ terminal, to process payment card transactions
 Oil rigs with production, drilling and quarters, e.g. Thunder Horse PDQ

Computing:
 Powerbook G3 PDQ (aka Wallstreet Series II), an Apple laptop computer
 Qualcomm pdQ, precursor to the Kyocera 6035, an early smartphone
 PDQ (Pretty DUN Quick),  Neil J. Gunther's performance analysis software
 Physician Data Query, the US National Cancer Institute cancer database

Entertainment:
 PDQ (game show), a US TV show 1966-1969
 Prose Descriptive Qualities, a role-playing game system

See also
 P. D. Q. Bach, a fictitious composer